Lymphotoxin-beta (LT-beta) also known as tumor necrosis factor C (TNF-C) is a protein that in humans is encoded by the LTB gene.

Function 

Lymphotoxin beta is a type II membrane protein of the TNF family. It anchors lymphotoxin-alpha to the cell surface through heterotrimer formation. The predominant form on the lymphocyte surface is the lymphotoxin-alpha 1/beta 2 complex (e.g. 1 molecule alpha/2 molecules beta) and this complex is the primary ligand for the lymphotoxin-beta receptor. The minor complex is lymphotoxin-alpha 2/beta 1. LTB is an inducer of the inflammatory response system and involved in normal development of lymphoid tissue. Lymphotoxin-beta isoform b is unable to complex with lymphotoxin-alpha suggesting a function for lymphotoxin-beta which is independent of lymphotoxin-alpha. Alternative splicing results in multiple transcript variants encoding different isoforms.

Pro-tumorigenic function of membrane LT is clearly established: mice with overexpression of LTα or LTβ showed increased tumor growth and metastasis in several models of cancer. However, these studies utilized mice with complete LTα gene deficiency that did not allow to distinguish effects of soluble versus membrane-associated LT.

Interactions 

LTB has been shown to interact with Lymphotoxin alpha.

References

Further reading 

 
 
 
 
 
 
 
 
 
 
 
 
 
 
 
 
 
 

Cytokines